The Act 43 Geo 3 c 56, sometimes called the Passenger Vessels Act 1803 or the Passenger Act 1803, was an Act of the Parliament of the United Kingdom, passed in 1803. It was the first of many laws intended to regulate the transportation of immigrants and to protect emigrants on board ships from exploitation by transportation companies (such as exorbitant rates and consequent subjection to poor sanitary conditions). The Passenger Act required improved conditions relating to hygiene, food and comfort for passengers travelling to North America. However, this law was not always followed by transportation providers and the spread of infectious diseases such as typhus continued.

This Act was established under humanitarian pretences, but the more practical and desired effect was to raise the cost of passage to prevent as many as possible from leaving. Landlords who feared the emigration of their tenants lobbied extensively for this piece of legislation, and where one could previously travel to Canada for £3–4, the price for the same passage was in some cases raised to £10 or more. The ability to move abroad was subsequently limited to a small class of people until it was repealed in 1826.

Notes and references 

 
 

United Kingdom Acts of Parliament 1803
Repealed United Kingdom Acts of Parliament
Maritime history of the United Kingdom
History of immigration to the United Kingdom
British emigrants